Gianni Ferlenghi (born 11 February 1931) is an Italian former professional racing cyclist. He rode in three editions of the Tour de France.

References

External links
 

1931 births
Living people
Italian male cyclists
Sportspeople from the Province of Livorno
Cyclists from Tuscany